The Heart of Maryland (1927) is a silent film costume Vitaphone drama produced and distributed by Warner Bros. and directed by Lloyd Bacon. The film stars Dolores Costello in the title character and features Jason Robards, Sr. It is based on David Belasco's 1895 play The Heart of Maryland performed on Broadway.  The film is the last silent version of the often filmed Victorian story, with versions having been produced in 1915 and 1921.

Cast
Dolores Costello as Maryland Calvert
Jason Robards, Sr. as Maj. Alan Kendrick
Warner Richmond as Captain Fulton Thorpe
Helene Costello as Nancy
Carroll Nye as Lloyd Calvert
Charles Edward Bull as Abraham Lincoln
Erville Alderson as Maj. Gen. Kendrick
Paul Kruger as Tom Boone
Walter Rodgers as Gen. U.S. Grant
Jim Welch as Gen. Robert E. Lee
Orpha Alba as Mammy
Myrna Loy as Mulatta
Harry Northrup as Gen. Joe Hooker
Nick Cogley as Eli Stanton
Lew Short as Allan Pinkerton
Leonard Mellon as Young Stewart
Madge Hunt as Mrs. Abraham Lincoln
Charles Force as Col. Lummon
Francis Ford as Jefferson Davis
S. D. Wilcox as Gen. Winfield Scott

Preservation status
An incomplete print of the film is at the Library of Congress.

See also
The Heart of Maryland (1915)
The Heart of Maryland (1921)
List of early Warner Bros. sound and talking features

References

External links

original lobby card

1927 films
American silent feature films
Films directed by Lloyd Bacon
American films based on plays
American Civil War films
American black-and-white films
Remakes of American films
1920s historical drama films
American historical drama films
Warner Bros. films
1920s English-language films
1927 directorial debut films
1927 drama films
1920s American films
Silent American drama films